Swansea Wilderness is a protected wilderness area in the central portion of the Buckskin Mountains divided by a large gorge formed by the Bill Williams River in the U.S. state of Arizona.  Established in 1990 under the Arizona Desert Wilderness Act the area is managed by the Bureau of Land Management. The namesake of the area, the ghost town Swansea is located south of the wilderness area.

North of the river, the wilderness area extends into Mohave County onto the Black Mesa, west of the Rawhide Mountains.  Elevation ranges from 670 feet (204 m) to 1900 feet (579 m).

See also
 List of Arizona Wilderness Areas
 List of U.S. Wilderness Areas

References

IUCN Category Ib
Wilderness areas of Arizona
Protected areas of La Paz County, Arizona
Protected areas of Mohave County, Arizona
Protected areas established in 1990
1990 establishments in Arizona